Stirling Castle is a castle in Stirling, Scotland.

Stirling Castle may also refer to:

 HMS Stirling Castle: one of a number of Royal Navy ships
 Stirling Castle (ship): one of a number of merchant ships